William Batten (26 May 1889 – 26 January 1959) was an English professional rugby league footballer who played in the 1900s, 1910s and 1920s. He is noted as one of the greatest of his era, one of the game's first superstars, Batten was a brilliant athlete and a huge crowd-puller – and also well aware of his own worth. In 1988 he became one of the inaugural inductees of the Rugby Football League Hall of Fame. Batten is also a member of the Hull FC, and Wakefield Trinity halls of fame.

Early life
Batten was born on 26 May 1889 in the mining village of Kinsley, near Fitzwilliam, in the West Riding of Yorkshire, England. His parents were James and Ann Batten, who both migrated to Yorkshire from North Wales. Batten started his rugby career with Kinsley and Ackworth United before joining Hunslet at the age of 17.

Professional playing career

Hunslet
Batten made his début for Hunslet in February 1907 in a 15–0 victory over Barrow. He helped the club win All Four Cups in 1907–08. He was selected to play for Great Britain during the 1908–09 Kangaroo tour of Great Britain. Batten was also a member of the first British touring team to travel to Australasia under the leadership of James Lomas in 1910. He was selected to play during the tour against Australia (2 matches), Australasia (2 matches), and New Zealand.
Batten was known for his trademark "Batten Leap" – his ability to hurdle players. He passed this trick on to his son Eric Batten, but the tactic was later outlawed because of its potential dangers.

Billy Batten played , i.e. number 5, in  Hunslet's 14-0 victory over Hull F.C. in the 1907–08 Challenge Cup Final during the 1907–08 season at Fartown Ground, Huddersfield on Saturday 25 April 1908, in front of a crowd of 18,000.

Billy Batten played  in Hunslet's 17–0 victory over Halifax in the 1907–08 Yorkshire County Cup Final during the 1907–08 season at Headingley Rugby Stadium, Leeds on Saturday 21 December 1907.

Batten was selected to play for Great Britain during the 1911-12 Kangaroo tour of Great Britain. Altogether, Batten won caps for England while at Hunslet in 1908 against Wales (2 matches), in 1908–09 against Australia (3 matches), Wales, in 1910 against Wales, in 1911–12 against Australia (2 matches), in 1912 against Wales, in 1913 against Wales. He also won caps for Great Britain while at Hunslet in 1908 against New Zealand, and Australia, in 1909 against Australia (2 matches).

During his time at Hunslet Batten was offered £4 a week to sign for Manchester United.

Hull
He joined Hull F.C. for a then record fee of £600 in April 1913 (based on increases in average earnings, this would be approximately £205,400 in 2013), and was to be paid £14 per match (in contrast to the £4 a week he had been offered to sign for Manchester United), a huge sum at the time (based on increases in average earnings, this would be approximately £4,794 in 2013), plus an additional special bonus. These were huge figures at the time and made Batten possibly the highest-paid professional footballer in Britain, if not the world. He helped the club win the Challenge Cup in his first season, when his presence in the side reportedly added £500 to gate receipts per game. Such was his popularity that Hull F.C. would print "Batten certain to play" over posters advertising their home games at the Boulevard.

Batten played right-, i.e. number 3, in Hull FC's 6-0 victory over Wakefield Trinity in the 1913–14 Challenge Cup Final during the 1913–14 season at Thrum Hall, Halifax, in front of a crowd of 19,000, played left-, i.e. number 4, and scored a try in the 9-10 defeat by Rochdale Hornets in the 1921–22 Challenge Cup Final during the 1921–22 season at Headingley, Rugby Stadium, Leeds, in front of a crowd of 34,827.

Batten declined the opportunity to tour again with Britain in 1914 for "business reasons". His benefit match in 1920 reaped an incredible £1,079 13s 8d. (based on increases in average earnings, this would be approximately £112,700 in 2013). To put that in context Alex Murphy, one of the game's true legends, raised approximately £2,000 in his "phenomenally successful testimonial year" almost 50 years later (based on increases in average earnings, this would be approximately £61,970 in 2013). Batten won caps for England while at Hull in 1921 against Wales, and Other Nationalities, in 1922 against Wales, in 1923 against Wales, He was transferred to Wakefield in May 1924 for £350.

Wakefield Trinity

Batten signed for Wakefield Trinity in May 1924, he made his début during August 1924, playing in 79 games over the next couple of years, scoring six tries and kicking two goals. Billy Batten played right-, i.e. number 3, in Wakefield Trinity's 9–8 victory over Batley in the 1924–25 Yorkshire County Cup Final during the 1924–25 season at Headingley Rugby Stadium, Leeds on Saturday 22 November 1924, and played right- in the 3–10 defeat by Huddersfield in the 1926–27 Yorkshire County Cup Final during the 1926–27 season at Headingley Rugby Stadium, Leeds on Wednesday 1 December 1926. He also continued his representative rugby career, playing for Yorkshire on four occasions. He stayed at Wakefield Trinity for two seasons before moving to Castleford in January 1927.

Castleford

Batten played in Castleford's inaugural 1926–27 season.

Drop-goals
Batten appears to have scored no drop-goals, but prior to the 1974–75 season all goals, whether; conversions, penalties, or drop-goals, scored 2-points, consequently prior to this date drop-goals were often not explicitly documented, therefore '0' drop-goals may indicate drop-goals not recorded, rather than no drop-goals scored. In addition, prior to the 1949–50 season, the archaic field-goal was also still a valid means of scoring points.

Batten dynasty

Billy Batten had two brothers who were also famous players and the Batten dynasty continued with his three sons who all played at the top level, with Eric appearing in a record eight Challenge Cup Finals. Batten's marriage to Annie (née Glover) (birth registered second ¼ 1889 in Hemsworth district) was registered during first ¼ 1909 in Wakefield district. They had children; William Batten (birth registered during third ¼ 1909 in Hemsworth district), Sydney M. Batten (birth registered during third ¼ 1911 in Hemsworth district), Mary Batten (birth registered during first ¼ 1913 in Hemsworth district), Frederick E. Batten (birth registered during third ¼ 1914 in Hemsworth district), Florence M. Batten (birth registered during third ¼ 1916 in Hemsworth district), Emily Batten (birth registered during second ¼ 1919 in Hemsworth district), Ann V. Batten (birth registered during third ¼ 1923 in Hemsworth district), and Robert Batten (birth registered during first ¼ 1927 in Hemsworth district). Batten's sons; Eric Batten, Billy Batten Jr. and Bob Batten (Castleford 1951–55), were also top class rugby league footballers, as was Billy Batten, Jr.'s son, the rugby league footballer Ray Batten, he was also the uncle of the rugby league footballer Stan Smith.

Notes

References

External links
(archived by web.archive.org) Billy Batten at rugbyleaguehistory.co.uk
(archived by web.archive.org) Billy Batten at hunslet.org.uk

1889 births
1959 deaths
Castleford Tigers players
England national rugby league team players
English rugby league players
Great Britain national rugby league team players
Hull F.C. players
Hunslet F.C. (1883) players
People from Fitzwilliam, West Yorkshire
Rugby league centres
Rugby league fullbacks
Rugby league players from Wakefield
Rugby league wingers
Wakefield Trinity players
Yorkshire rugby league team players